Chain Reaction is a 1996 American science fiction action thriller film directed by Andrew Davis, starring Keanu Reeves, Morgan Freeman, Rachel Weisz, Fred Ward, Kevin Dunn and Brian Cox. The plot centers on the invention of a new non-contaminating power source based on hydrogen and the attempts by the United States Government to prevent the spreading of this technology to other countries. The film was released in the United States on August 2, 1996.

Plot
While working with a team from the University of Chicago to convert hydrogen from water into clean energy, machinist Eddie Kasalivich inadvertently discovers the secret: a sound frequency that perfectly stabilizes their process. As the project team celebrates with a party at the lab,  Dr. Paul Shannon, the leader of the project, and Dr. Alistair Barkley, the project manager, argue because Alistair wants to share the science and Paul thinks the US should keep the news to itself. After the party, project physicist Dr. Lily Sinclair finds her car unable to start, so Eddie gets her home by bus. Back in the lab, Alistair and assistant Dr. Lu Chen are on their computers preparing to upload their discovery to the Internet so they can share the breakthrough with the world, when a band of men enter the lab and attack the pair.

Returning to the lab to get his motorcycle, Eddie hears alarms and runs inside to find Alistair dead with a plastic bag over his head and Chen missing. As the hydrogen reactor has become dangerously unstable, Eddie, unable to shut it down, speeds away on his motorbike as a concealed detonator triggers a massive hydrogen explosion that destroys the lab and surrounding streets.

Upon returning from questioning by the FBI to their homes, Eddie and Lily realize that they are being framed, with planted evidence found in both of their houses. The two flee to an observatory belonging to Maggie McDermott, an old friend of Eddie's. They contact Paul, but they are almost caught in the process and narrowly escape. As the pair are evading more police, Paul meets with Lyman Earl Collier at C-Systems Research complex to discuss the current events. It becomes apparent that Lyman and the CIA orchestrated the plot to destroy the lab and frame the pair for it. Despite some disagreement, Paul and Lyman decide to continue the hunt for the pair, a task facilitated when Eddie sends a coded message to Paul arranging a meeting. At their rendezvous, Paul reveals his involvement, but Lyman’s thugs (the ones who murdered Alistair) capture Lily while Eddie barely escapes.

After tracing the license plate on the thugs' van, Eddie tracks them to the secret C-Systems Research facility where Paul and Lyman are forcing Lily and Chen who had been kidnapped, to replicate the project. Eddie sneaks in during the night and proceeds to "fix" the system.

The next morning, one of the other scientists discovers the working reactor and everyone celebrates. A suspicious Paul immediately obtains a download of the working data, and secretly gives it to his assistant, Anita, for safekeeping. He then finds Eddie at a computer in the company boardroom, who demands his release in exchange for making the reactor work. Paul agrees but Lyman refuses, believing that the process already works, so Eddie sets the reactor to explode while sending proof of his innocence to the FBI and blueprints of the reactor to "hopefully a couple thousand" international scientists. Lyman responds by shooting Chen dead, then locking in Eddie and Lily to die in the explosion.

Paul kills Lyman for overstepping the bounds of the program, leaving the body to be incinerated in the explosion. During his own escape, he deactivates the containment system, allowing Eddie and Lily to escape. They are attacked by Lyman's henchmen (Yusef Reed and Clancy Butler), but escape moments before a blast wave sweeps through the complex (incinerating both Reed and Butler's corpses).

Having survived the shockwave, Eddie and Lily are met by FBI agents Ford and Doyle, now convinced of their innocence, who take them to safety. Paul is shown departing the scene via chauffeured limo, and the last scene has him dictating a memo to his secretary Anita, which informs the Director of the CIA that "...C-System [is] no longer a viable entity."

Cast

 Keanu Reeves as Eddie Kasalivich. A machinist working on a team from the University of Chicago. He is forced on the run with Dr. Lily Sinclair when someone frames him for the murder of his boss, Dr. Alistair Barkley, and the destruction of his laboratory. He must work to clear their names before they are captured or killed.
 Morgan Freeman as Paul Shannon. The enigmatic leader of the project at the University of Chicago. His motives are unclear throughout the movie, but he advises Eddie to turn himself in to the authorities. It is later disclosed that he is the head of the entire program that includes Lyman, who tries to have the research team killed. A scene with Agents Ford and Doyle and the ending suggests Shannon is with the CIA.
 Rachel Weisz as Lily Sinclair. Physicist working with Dr. Alistair Barkley. She goes on the run with Eddie when they are framed for Alistair's murder and the destruction of his laboratory.
 Fred Ward as FBI Agent Leon Ford. In charge of the investigation to discover the cause of the destruction of the laboratory. Initially focuses on Eddie and Lily, but soon suspects the involvement of government organizations.
 Kevin Dunn as FBI Agent Doyle. Ford's assistant in the investigation. He helps Ford track down Eddie, Lily, and later, C-Systems.
 Brian Cox as Lyman Earl Collier. Chairman of C-Systems Research. Person behind the conspiracy to keep the Hydrogen power plant a secret.
 Joanna Cassidy as Maggie McDermott. An old friend of Eddie's who lives in an observatory in Wisconsin. Eddie and Lily head to her place after a warrant is issued for their arrest.
 Chelcie Ross as FBI Agent Ed Rafferty. 
 Nicholas Rudall as Dr. Alistair Barkley. Head of the project to develop energy from water. Eddie finds him suffocated.
 Tzi Ma as Lu Chen. Project Manager on the Hydrogen Project and Dr. Barkley's right-hand man. When Barkley is killed, Dr. Chen is kidnapped and forced to work at C-Systems.
 Krzysztof Pieczyński as Lucasz Screbneski, scientist on the original project who is secretly working for C-Systems.
 Eddie Bo Smith Jr. and Danny Goldring  as Yusef Reed and Clancy Butler, Collier's right hand men for C-Systems

In addition, Michael Shannon and Neil Flynn make appearances as a van driver and a Wisconsin State Police Trooper, respectively.

Production
Large portions of the film were shot on location in and around Chicago, Illinois, including the University of Chicago, Argonne National Laboratory, the Museum of Science and Industry, the Field Museum of Natural History, Michigan Avenue, and the James R. Thompson Center (Atrium Mall). Additional scenes were shot at Yerkes Observatory in Williams Bay, Wisconsin, on Geneva Lake in southern Wisconsin, interiors of the U.S. Capitol were shot at the Wisconsin State Capitol, in Madison, Wisconsin, at Inland Steel (now known as MITTAL Steel) in East Chicago, Indiana, and at a private residence in Barrington Hills, Illinois. Because of the cold Great Lakes winter and filming taking place during record breaking winter weather, unique challenges were present for the cast and crew. Morgan Freeman noted that "It was difficult for everyone, particularly for me because I'm tropical," he said. "I don't do cold weather. This is Chicago...in the winter. I was ill and in bed four days at a crack. It was really rough." Among the extras in the film were then-U.S. Representative (later U.S. Senator) Tammy Baldwin (D-Wis.)

Reception
Chain Reaction received negative reviews. It holds an 18% rating on Rotten Tomatoes based on 33 reviews. Audiences polled by CinemaScore gave the film an average grade of "C+" on an A+ to F scale.

Roger Ebert gave the film two and a half stars out of four, writing: "By movie's end, I'd seen some swell photography and witnessed some thrilling chase scenes, but when it came to understanding the movie, I didn't have a clue." Jeff Millar of the Houston Chronicle wrote: "The narrative is very complex, but what's on the screen is little more than generic, non-narrative-specific, guy-being-chased stuff". Conversely, Edward Guthmann of the San Francisco Chronicle felt the film was one of the summer's best movies, writing: "[Chain Reaction] has better acting, better writing, more spectacular chase sequences and more genuine drama than all of this summer's blockbusters."

Chain Reaction and its cast were nominated for one award, with Keanu Reeves being nominated for the Razzie for Worst Actor, which was won by both Tom Arnold and Pauly Shore.

Chain Reaction grossed just over USD$60.2 million worldwide.

Later Keanu Reeves admitted than he thinks "Chain Reaction" was a “stinker“ and blamed the script changes: “Originally, I was married. I had this kid and I did this research and I didn't know that what I was researching had this effect. And someone got killed and I had these regrets and I'm trying to stop what I'm doing, but they can't let me so they're chasing me. And then all of a sudden I turn into this 24-year-old machinist and I turned to Andrew Davis and I said, 'What happened to the movie I said yes to? What happened to that script? Where did that go?' And he said, 'No, I got something better,' and so I just had to go with it.“

Scientific accuracy

In one interpretation of the film's plot, a scientific process supposedly extracts hydrogen from water, then burns the hydrogen to generate power, and leaves only water as a residue, essentially a chemical perpetual motion. The movie never clarifies how the hydrogen is extracted from the water, nor how water is still left over. The character Dr. Shannon makes contradictory statements in the combination of ideas mashed together: one time he says this is accomplished with a laser with millions of degrees, another time he says frequencies of sound and sonoluminescence. In one scene, the movie shows a bubbling container reminiscent of cold fusion electrolytic cells and another references sustained fusion.  A character in the film claims that a glass of water could power Chicago for weeks, but no clear explanation is ever given as to whether this is by simply burning hydrogen released by highly efficient means or through nuclear processes.  The film's title is also misleading, since "chain reaction" is related to nuclear fission, not fusion.

The film is based around the premise that free energy suppression is real. The main character is told that his discovery is too disruptive: energy would suddenly be cheap, oil would no longer be necessary, oil companies would go bankrupt, and such sudden economic changes would throw society into chaos.

References

External links
  Chain Reaction on Youtube
 
 
 
 

1996 films
1996 action thriller films
1990s chase films
1996 science fiction films
20th Century Fox films
3 Arts Entertainment films
American chase films
American science fiction action films
American action thriller films
American science fiction thriller films
Fictional portrayals of the Chicago Police Department
Films scored by Jerry Goldsmith
Films about kidnapping
Films about miscarriage of justice
Films about nuclear technology
Films about scientists
Films directed by Andrew Davis
Films set in Chicago
Films set in Virginia
Films set in Washington, D.C.
Films shot in Wisconsin
Techno-thriller films
The Zanuck Company films
1990s English-language films
1990s American films